Alencar is a crater on Mercury. It has a diameter of 120 kilometers. Its name was adopted by the International Astronomical Union (IAU) in 1979. Alencar is named for the Brazilian novel writer José de Alencar, who lived from 1829 to 1877.

Alencar is located to the north of the larger crater Bach.

References

Impact craters on Mercury